Jan Sterling (born Jane Sterling Adriance; April 3, 1921 – March 26, 2004) was an American film, television and stage actress. At her most active in films during the 1950s (immediately prior to which she had joined the Actors Studio), Sterling received a Golden Globe Award for Best Supporting Actress for her performance in The High and the Mighty (1954), as well as an Academy Award for Best Supporting Actress nomination. Her best performance is often considered to be opposite Kirk Douglas, as the opportunistic wife in Billy Wilder's 1951 Ace in the Hole. Although her career declined during the 1960s, she continued to play occasional television and theatre roles.

Early life
Born in New York City, Sterling was the daughter of Eleanor Ward (née Deans) and William Allen Adriance Jr, an architect and advertising executive. She had a younger sister, Ann "Mimi" Adriance, a model and businesswoman. Jane grew up in a wealthy household and attended private schools before moving with her family to Europe and South America. In London and Paris she was schooled by private tutors, and in London she attended Fay Compton's dramatic school. During the taping of the pilot of a game show in 1968, she told the story of having been sent airfare to fly back to the United States; seeing some lingerie she liked in a shop window, she used the last of her money to buy it, then traded in the airfare and booked aboard a steamship.  Midway through the voyage, she found out that the airship she had originally been booked on, the Hindenburg, had been destroyed in a massive fire upon arriving in New Jersey on May 6, 1937.

Acting career

As a teenager, she returned to the borough of Manhattan, and using variations of her given name, including "Jane Adriance" and "Jane Sterling", she began her acting career in 1938 by performing on Broadway as the character Chris Faringdon in Bachelor Born. She then appeared in a variety of other Broadway productions during the 1940s, such as When We Were Married, This Rock, and The Rugged Path. In 1947 she made her film debut in Tycoon, billed as Jane Darian. Ruth Gordon reportedly insisted she change her stage name, and they agreed upon Jan Sterling. She played a prominent supporting role in Johnny Belinda (1948). Alternating between films and television, Sterling appeared in several television anthology series during the 1950s, and played film roles in Caged (1950), Mystery Street (1950), Union Station (1950), The Mating Season (1951), Ace in the Hole (1951), Flesh and Fury (1952), The High and the Mighty (1954), Female on the Beach (1955), and High School Confidential (1958). Often cast as hard and determined characters, she played a more sympathetic character in Sky Full of Moon (1952). In 1950, she was cast as "Ruth" (the girlfriend of Deputy Roscoe, played by veteran western film star Roscoe Ates) on ABC's The Marshal of Gunsight Pass.

In 1954, Sterling was nominated for an Academy Award and won a Golden Globe Award for Best Supporting Actress for her performance in The High and the Mighty. Later that year, she travelled to Britain to play the role of Julia in the first film version of George Orwell's 1984, despite being several months pregnant at the time. During the following years, she appeared regularly in films. Some of her appearances on American television series include the title character in "The Annie Griffith Story" on Wagon Train in 1959 and "The Selena Hartnell Story" in 1961; and during the 1960s, guest-starring role on Riverboat, her performance as Dianne Jordan in a 1960 Bonanza episode ("The Blood Line"), her portrayal of Nurse Murdoch in the 1963 episode "Millions of Faces" on ABC's Breaking Point, and her performance in the 1967 episode "Eleven Miles to Eden" of NBC's The Road West. In late 1968, Sterling began portraying the conniving "Miss Foss" on The Guiding Light. After performing in the 1969 film The Minx, she curtailed her appearances in films and on television but continued to work on stage. She did, however, return to television in 1979 to portray the wife of President Herbert Hoover in Backstairs at the White House, and in 1981 Sterling made her last film appearance playing Walter Matthau's wife in the First Monday in October.

Marriages
Sterling was married twice. In 1941 she wed actor John Merivale, a union that ended in divorce seven years later. She then married another actor, Paul Douglas, in 1950 and remained with him until his death in 1959. In the 1970s, she entered into a long-lasting personal relationship with Sam Wanamaker. Inactive professionally for nearly two decades, she made an appearance at the Cinecon Film Festival in Los Angeles in 2001.

Health and death
Sterling's later life was marked by illness and injury that included diabetes, a broken hip and a series of strokes. Her son died of heart failure in December 2003 aged 48. Sterling died three months later, on March 26, 2004, aged 82, at the Motion Picture and Television Hospital in Woodland Hills, California.

Films 

Tycoon (1947) – Dancer at Fiesta (uncredited)
Johnny Belinda (1948) – Stella McCormick
Caged (1950) – Jeta Kovsky – aka Smoochie
The Skipper Surprised His Wife (1950) – Rita Rossini
Mystery Street (1950) – Vivian Heldon
Gunfire (1950) – Flo – Saloon Girl (uncredited)
Union Station (1950) – Marge Wrighter
Snow Dog (1950)
The Mating Season (1951) – Betsy
Appointment with Danger (1951) – Dodie
Ace in the Hole (1951) – Lorraine Minosa
Rhubarb (1951) – Polly Sickles
Flesh and Fury (1952) – Sonya Bartow
Sky Full of Moon (1952) – Dixie Delmar
Pony Express (1953) – Denny Russell
Split Second (1953) – Dottie Vale
The Vanquished (1953) – Rose Slater
Alaska Seas (1954) – Nicky Jackson
The High and the Mighty (1954) – Sally McKee
Return from the Sea (1954) – Frieda
The Human Jungle (1954) – Mary Abbott
Women's Prison (1955) – Brenda Martin
Female on the Beach (1955) – Amy Rawlinson
Man with the Gun (1955) – Nelly Bain
1984 (1956) – Julia of the Outer Party
The Harder They Fall (1956) – Beth Willis
Slaughter on Tenth Avenue (1957) – Madge Pitts
The Female Animal (1958) – Lily Frayne
High School Confidential! (1958) – Arlene Williams
Kathy O' (1958) – Celeste Saunders
Love in a Goldfish Bowl (1961) – Sandra Slide
The Incident (1967) – Muriel Purvis
The Angry Breed (1968) – Gloria Patton
The Minx (1969) – Louise Baxter
Sammy Somebody (1976)
First Monday in October (1981) – Christine Snow

Radio appearances

References

External links

 
 
 
 
 
 The Guardian UK obituary
 Images of Jan Sterling's 1960 passport (with incorrect year of birth), passportland.com; accessed May 3, 2014.

1921 births
2004 deaths
20th-century American actresses
Actresses from New York City
American film actresses
American stage actresses
American television actresses
Best Supporting Actress Golden Globe (film) winners
Deaths from diabetes
American expatriates in France
American expatriates in the United Kingdom
21st-century American women